Gajanan Jagirdar (2 April 1907 – 13 August 1988) was a veteran Indian film director, screenwriter and actor. He worked in Hindi Cinema, also called Bollywood, as well as Marathi cinema. The period of 1942 to 1947, saw his rise as a film director with Prabhat Films.

He was appointed as the first director (then principal) of the Film and Television Institute of India (FTII) in 1960 which was known as Film Institute of India then. Jagirdar served as the director of the FTII for just over a year, from 1961 to 1962. He was associated with the Prabhat Film Company three decades before his FTII role, when the campus was the base of the Prabhat.

He became a well-known pedagogue applying the acting theories of Stanislavsky to the prevailing local conditions.

At the 1962 National Film Awards his film Vaijayanta was awarded the Second Best Marathi Feature Film.

Early life
Gajanan Jagirdar was born on 2 April 1907 in Amravati, a city in Amravati district, which was a part of the erstwhile Bombay Presidency of British India. He started acting as a child actor in the amateur stage. Gajanan was a teacher before joining the film industry.

Film career
Gajanan began his film career in 1931 as a scenarist and assistant director in Prabhat Film Company and became a full-fledged film director only two years later in 1934. His first Bollywood film was Sinhasan (1934) as a director.
Gajanan Jagirdar's role of Ramshastri in the movie Ramshastri (film) won him immense appreciation and popularity.

Filmography

As Director
 Honhar (1936) 
 Main Hari (1940)
 Charnon Ki Dasi (1941)
 Vasantsena (1942)
 Ramshastri (1944, Marathi) 
 Behram Khan (1946, Hindi)
 Jail Yatra (1947)
 Umaaje Naik (1961, Marathi) (as producer) 
 Vijayanta (1961, Marathi)

As Actor

 Talaq (1938) - Chhabilelal
 Meetha Zahar (1938)
 Shejari (1941) - Mirza
 Payachi Dasi (1941) - Nokheram
 Padosi (1941) - Mirza
 Vasantsena (1942) - Shakar
 Kanoon (1943)
 Ramshastri (1944) - Ramshastri
 Kiran (1944)
 Jhumke (1946)
 Behram Khan (1946)
 Dhanyawad (1948)
 Lekh (1949)
 Sabak (1950)
 Chhatrapati Shivaji (1952) - King Aurangzeb
 Armaan (1953)
 Mahatma (1953, Marathi)
 Gajanan Maharaj Ki Jai (1954)
 Malka-e-Alam Noorjehan (1954)
 Mahatma Kabir (1954)
 Maan (1954)
 Angarey (1954) - Singoba
 Ghar Ghar Mein Diwali (1955) - Seth Mohanlal
 Ramshastri Ka Nyay (1956)
 Chhoo Mantar (1956) - The King
 Yahudi Ki Ladki (1957) 
 Talaash (1957)
 Paying Guest (1957) - Public Prosecutor Dayal
 Apradhi Kaun? (1957) - Shree Nath / Dina Nath
 Trolley Driver (1958)
 Karigar (1958) - Shankar's Employer
 Dulhan (1958) - Seth Dhanpal
 Raj Tilak (1958) - Sardar Mangal Sen
 Qaidi No. 911 (1959) - Jailor
 Chacha Zindabad (1959) - Judge Khanna
 Hum Hindustani (1960) - Verma
 Babar (1960) - Shehenshah Jaheeruddin Babar
 Hum Dono (1961) - Mita's Father
 Main Chup Rahungi (1962) - Ratan Kumar
 Aarti (1962) - Deepak's Father
 Grahasti (1963) - Maya and Radha's dad
 Ek Don Teen (1964)
 Guide (1965) - Bhola
 Tu Hi Meri Zindagi (1965)
 Saiyan Se Neha Lagaibe (1965)
 Kaajal (1965) - Saxena
 Ek Saal Pehle (1965)
 Yugo Yugo Mi Vaat Pahili (1965, Marathi)
 Shankar Khan (1966) - Lala Kedarnath
 Suraj (1966) - Ram Singh
 Amrapali (1966) - Kulpati Mahanam
 Hum Kahan Ja Rahe Hain (1966) - Principal
 Dillagi (1966) - Raibahadur
 Chhota Bhai (1966) - Poojary
 Mera Naam Johar (1968) - Lalji
 Dil Aur Mohabbat''' (1968) - Hostel Warden
 Jhuk Gaya Aasman (1968) - Shankarlal Khanna
 Humsaya (1968) - Sharma - Intelligence Office Chief
 Farishta (1968)
 Beti Tumhare Jaisi (1969)
 Aadmi Aur Insaan (1969) - Judge
 Ittefaq (1969) - Dr. Trivedi
 Sajan (1969) - Guruji
 Paisa Ya Pyaar (1969) - Shankarlal
 Nanak Naam Jahaz Hai (1969) - Judge
 Insaan Aur Shaitan (1970) - Shankar Chauhan
 Ghar Ghar Ki Kahani (1970) - Padma's brother
 Devi (1970) - Ram Singh (Driver)
Chingari (1971 film)
 Veer Chhatrasal (1971)
 Bahake Kadam (1971)
 Nate Jadale Don Jiwaache (1971)
 Chingari (1971) - Advocate
 Jwala (1971) - Sardar
 Hulchul (1971) - Padma's Father
 Albela (1971)
 Chori Chori (1972) - Komal's Father
 Zindagi Zindagi (1972) - Mr. Sharma
 Sub Ka Saathi (1972) - Sevak Ram
 Sonal (1973)
 Bandhe Haath (1973) - Seth. Harnam Das
 Aa Gale Lag Jaa (1973) - Dr. Saxena
 Badi Maa (1974)
 Woh Main Nahin (1974) - Judge
 Raja Shiv Chhatrapati (1974)
 Hamrahi (1974)
 Archana (1974) - Gopal Kaka
 Aashiana (1974)
 Awara Ladki (1975)
 Mutthi Bhar Chawal (1975)
 Dafaa 302: Indian Penal Code Section 302 (Section of Murder) (1975) - Judge
 Badnaam (1975) - Shankerlal
 Gumrah (1976) - Professor Vaidya
 Aaj Ka Ye Ghar (1976)
 Immaan Dharam (1977) - Barkat Chacha
 Dhoop Chhaon (1977) - Abdul
 Shankar Hussain (1977) - Mir Irshaad Hussain
 Ram Bharose (1977)
 Paradh (1977)
 Naami Chor (1977)
 Mera Vachan Geeta Ki Kasam (1977) - Swamiji
 Mandir Masjid (1977)
 Aadmi Sadak Ka (1977) - Retd. Commissioner Upendra Nath
 Des Pardes (1978) - Mr. Sahni
 Saajan Bina Suhagan (1978) - Doctor (uncredited)
 Karmayogi (1978) - Principal
 Dost Asava Tar Asa (1978) - Retired Commissioner
 Ankh Ka Tara (1978) - Karim
 Anjaam (1978) - Maharaja
 Saanch Ko Aanch Nahin (1979) - Hariram
 Naiyya (1979) - Sarpanch of Lakhipur
 Maan Apmaan (1979) - Parvati's dadBeqasoor (1980 film) - Jagmohan Sinha
 Premika (1980)
 Manokaamnaa (1980) - Jain (Ex-DFO)
 Chambal Ki Kasam (1980) - Radhu Kaka
 Dostana (1980) - High School Principal
 Maan Abhiman (1980) - Money-lender Prabhu Dayal Gupta
 Dahshat (1981) - Elderly Doctor
 Kaalia (1981) - 1st Defense Attorney
 Umrao Jaan (1981) - Maulvi
 Maan Gaye Ustaad (1981) - Prosecuting Lawyer
 Khud-Daar (1982) - Judge
 Dharam Kanta (1982) - Mukhiya
 Sun Sajna (1982) - Doctor
 Love in Goa (1983) - Mr. D'Souza
 Rishta Kagaz Ka (1983) - Professor Sharma
 Lal Chunariya (1983) - Kundan's dad
 Laila (1984)
 Maan Maryada (1984) - Police Commissioner
 Bepanaah (1985) - Brahmprakash Bharadwaj
 Aap Ke Saath (1986) - Parsaji (oldman in "Aged Home")
 Sutradhar (1987) - Headmaster
 Soorma Bhopali (1988)
 Pyase Nain'' (1989) - Senior Police Inspector (final film role)

Awards and honors
Gajanan Jagirdar was awarded the best actor award for his portrayal  of the poet Parshuram in the film Shahir Parshuram by Government of Maharashtra in 1962. The Bengal journalists Association in 5th Annual BFJA Awards bestowed upon him the best actor award for his performance in the film's Padosi. The same Bengal journalists Association in 8th Annual BFJA Awards honoured him doubly in 1944 by citing him both as Best Actor of the Year and Best Director of the Year for his film Ramshastri.

Death
Gajanan Jagirdar died of a heart attack on 13 August 1988 at his residence in Bombay (now Mumbai), aged 81.

References

External links
 
 

1907 births
1988 deaths
Male actors in Hindi cinema
People from Amravati
Male actors in Marathi cinema
Hindi-language film directors
Marathi film directors
Indian male screenwriters
20th-century Indian male actors
Film directors from Maharashtra
Film producers from Maharashtra
20th-century Indian film directors
20th-century Indian screenwriters
20th-century Indian male writers